1815 Beethoven, provisional designation , is a carbonaceous background asteroid from the outer regions of the asteroid belt, approximately  in diameter. It was discovered on 27 January 1932, by German astronomer Karl Reinmuth at the Heidelberg Observatory. The uncommon F-type asteroid seems to have a long rotation period of 54 hours (tentative). It was named after Ludwig van Beethoven.

Orbit and classification 

Beethoven is a non-family asteroid from the main belt's background population when applying the hierarchical clustering method to its proper orbital elements. Based on osculating Keplerian orbital elements and in previous analysis by Zappalà, the asteroid has also been classified as a member of the Themis family, a very large family of carbonaceous asteroids, named after 24 Themis.

It orbits the Sun in the outer main-belt at a distance of 2.5–3.8 AU once every 5 years and 7 months (2,043 days; semi-major axis of 3.15 AU). Its orbit has an eccentricity of 0.19 and an inclination of 3° with respect to the ecliptic. The body's observation arc begins with its official discovery observation at Heidelberg in January 1992.

Naming 

This minor planet was named after German composer Ludwig van Beethoven (1770-1827). The official  was published by the Minor Planet Center on 20 February 1976.

Physical characteristics 

In the Tholen classification, Beethoven is an uncommon, carbonaceous F-type asteroid, while in the Barucci taxonomy, it is a C0 type.

Rotation period 

In January 2005, a fragmentary rotational lightcurve of Beethoven was obtained from photometric observations by Robert Stephens at his Santana Observatory  in California. Lightcurve analysis gave a rotation period of  hours with a brightness amplitude of 0.2 magnitude.

Diameter and albedo 

According to the surveys carried out by the Infrared Astronomical Satellite IRAS, the Japanese Akari satellite and several publications by the NEOWISE mission of NASA's Wide-field Infrared Survey Explorer, Beethoven measures between 23.7 and 33.9 kilometers in diameter and its surface has an albedo between 0.04 and 0.10.

The Collaborative Asteroid Lightcurve Link adopts the results obtained by IRAS, that is, an albedo of 0.0548 and a diameter of 30.36 kilometers based on an absolute magnitude of 11.36.

References

External links 
 Asteroid Lightcurve Database (LCDB), query form (info )
 Dictionary of Minor Planet Names, Google books
 Discovery Circumstances: Numbered Minor Planets (1)-(5000) – Minor Planet Center
 
 

001815
Discoveries by Karl Wilhelm Reinmuth
Named minor planets
1815 Beethoven
001815
19320127